Horst Bertram (born 16 November 1948 in Münster) is a retired German football manager and former player.

Bertram appeared twice for Kickers Offenbach in the Bundesliga before embarking on a 12-year spell at Borussia Dortmund, playing 200 games, 94 of which also coming in the Bundesliga.

References

External links
 

1948 births
Living people
Sportspeople from Münster
German footballers
Association football goalkeepers
Bundesliga players
2. Bundesliga players
SC Preußen Münster players
1. FC Bocholt players
Kickers Offenbach players
Borussia Dortmund players
German football managers
Footballers from North Rhine-Westphalia